Therese Elisabeth Alexandra Förster-Nietzsche (10 July 1846 – 8 November 1935) was the sister of philosopher Friedrich Nietzsche and the creator of the Nietzsche Archive in 1894.

Förster-Nietzsche was two years younger than her brother. Their father was a Lutheran pastor in the German village of Röcken bei Lützen. The two children were close during their childhood and early adult years. However, they grew apart in 1885 when Elisabeth married Bernhard Förster, a former high school teacher who had become a prominent German nationalist and antisemite. Friedrich Nietzsche did not attend their wedding.

Förster-Nietzsche and her husband created an unsuccessful colony, Nueva Germania, in Paraguay in 1887. Her husband killed himself in 1889. Förster-Nietzsche continued to run the colony until she returned to Germany in 1893 where she found her brother to be an invalid whose published writings were beginning to be read and discussed throughout Europe. Adolf Hitler attended her funeral in 1935.

In the 1950s it was claimed by Nietzsche's new editors and translators such as Walter Kaufmann that Nietzsche's work had been falsely edited by Elisabeth to highlight racist and eugenicist themes, but this account has been the subject of debate in recent scholarship. An alternative theory exonerates Elisabeth and places the distortion of Nietzsche's works in the hands of the Nazis themselves.

Early life

Elisabeth Förster-Nietzsche was born in 1846 to Carl Ludwig Nietzsche and Franziska Nietzsche (née Oehler). Therese Elisabeth Alexandra Nietzsche was so named after three princesses with whom Carl Ludwig Nietzsche had worked. Carl Ludwig was a Lutheran pastor in the German village of Röcken bei Lützen. Franziska was a rustic. Carl Ludwig died in 1849. Franziska had no prospects and her husband's pension was insufficient. She chose to rely on the charity of Carl Ludwig's mother, Erdmuthe, and the more distinguished prospects which she could open for the children. When remembering her early life, Förster-Nietzsche would suggest that they may have cried a lot.

Friedrich and Elisabeth were close during their childhood and early adult years. He took to calling her Llama throughout their lives because he felt that the description of the load bearing, saliva spitting, stubborn animal fit her well.

Nueva Germania 

Bernhard Förster planned to create a "pure Aryan settlement" in the New World, and had found a site in Paraguay which he thought would be suitable. The couple persuaded fourteen German families to join them in the colony, to be called Nueva Germania, and the group left Germany for South America on 15 February 1887.

The colony did not thrive. The German methods of farming were not suitable to the land, illness ran rampant, and transportation to the colony was slow and difficult. Faced with mounting debts, Förster committed suicide by poisoning himself on 3 June 1889. Four years later Elisabeth left the colony forever and returned to Germany. The colony still exists as a district of the San Pedro department.

Nietzsche Archive 

Friedrich Nietzsche's mental collapse occurred in 1889 (he died in 1900), and upon Elisabeth's return in 1893 she found him an invalid whose published writings were beginning to be read and discussed throughout Europe. Förster-Nietzsche took a leading role in promoting her brother, especially through the publication of a collection of Nietzsche's fragments under the name of The Will to Power.

Affiliation with the Nazi Party 
The common account made by Nietzsche new editors and translators in the 1950s has been that in 1930, Förster-Nietzsche, a German nationalist and antisemite, became a supporter of the Nazi Party and, as has been traditionally claimed, she falsified Nietzsche's work to make it a better fit to Nazi ideology. This account is now disputed by recent scholarship, which argues that Elisabeth's motivation in selectively editing Nietzsche's works was primarily intended to protect her brother from criticism and to present herself as being close to him.

When Hitler came to power in 1933, the Nietzsche Archive received financial support and publicity from the government, in return for which Förster-Nietzsche bestowed her brother's considerable prestige on the regime. Förster-Nietzsche's funeral in 1935 was attended by Hitler and several high-ranking German officials.

References

Sources 
 Diethe, Carol, Nietzsche's Sister and the Will to Power, Urbana: University of Illinois Press, 2003. (A biography of Elisabeth Förster-Nietzsche)
 Macintyre, Ben, Forgotten Fatherland: The Search for Elisabeth Nietzsche, New York: Farrar Straus Giroux, 1992.

External links

Entretien autour de Friedrich Nietzsche et son temps

1846 births
1935 deaths
Friedrich Nietzsche
German emigrants to Paraguay
Nazi Party members
People from Lützen
People from the Province of Saxony
Academic staff of the Alice Salomon University of Applied Sciences Berlin